Xanthorrhoea platyphylla is a species of grasstree of the genus Xanthorrhoea native to Western Australia.

Description
It blooms in June producing cream-white flowers.

Distribution
It has a scattered distribution along the south coast in the Great southern and Goldfields-Esperance regions of Western Australia between Albany and Cape Arid where grows in sandy-clay soils containing gravel.

References

Asparagales of Australia
platyphylla
Angiosperms of Western Australia
Plants described in 1986
Endemic flora of Southwest Australia